Saxifraga consanguinea is a flowering plant species in the genus Saxifraga of the family Saxifragaceae.

History 
It was described by William Wright Smith.

References 

consanguinea
Plants described in 1913